The Missouri Southern Lions college football team competes as part of the National Collegiate Athletic Association (NCAA) Division II, and represents Missouri Southern State University  in the Mid-America Intercollegiate Athletics Association (MIAA). The Lions play their home games at Fred G. Hughes Stadium in Joplin, Missouri since 1975. Since their inaugural season, Missouri Southern has appeared in one NAIA Division II National Championship Game, and one NCAA Division II playoffs.

For the 1968–75 seasons, Missouri Southern competed as a NAIA independent, unaffiliated with a conference. They would later join the Central States intercollegiate conference. In 1989 the Lions joined the Missouri Intercollegiate Athletic Association, later renamed the Mid-America Intercollegiate Athletics Association, and the NCAA Division II ranks.

Seasons

References

Missouri Southern Lions
Missouri Southern Lions football seasons